San Miguelito is a city and district (distrito) of Panamá Province in Panama. The population according to the 2000 census was 293,745; the latest official estimate (for 2019) is 375,409. The district covers an area of 50.1 km². San Miguelito district is completely enclaved within Panama District (which completely surrounds it) and it is included in the Panama City Metropolitan Area.

Football player Luis Tejada was born in San Miguelito, and both Blas Pérez and Kevin Kurányi were once residents of the district.

Administrative divisions
San Miguelito District is divided administratively into the following corregimientos:

Amelia Denis de Icaza
Belisario Porras
José Domingo Espinar
Mateo Iturralde
Victoriano Lorenzo
Arnulfo Arias
Belisario Frías
Omar Torrijos
Rufina Alfaro

Education
International School of Panama is located in San Miguelito.

References